Streptaxidae is a family of carnivorous air-breathing land snails, terrestrial pulmonate gastropod mollusks in the clade
Stylommatophora. Six Streptaxidae subfamilies are accepted in the 2005 taxonomy of the Gastropoda by Bouchet & Rocroi.

Streptaxidae are carnivorous except for one species Edentulina moreleti, which is herbivorous. All streptaxids have well-developed radula, except  Careoradula perelegans, which is the only known terrestrial gastropod without radula.

Altogether 66 species from the family Streptaxidae are listed in the 2010 IUCN Red List.

Distribution 
The historical area of origin of the Streptaxidae is probably Gondwanaland.

The family is widely distributed across the tropical and subtropical areas of South America, Africa and Asia. The Recent native distribution of Streptaxidae includes South America, Africa, Arabia, Madagascar, Seychelles, Mayotte, Comores, Mauritius, Réunion, Rodrigues, India, Sri Lanka, Andamans, South-East Asia and the Philippines. The genus Gibbulinella is found in the Canary Islands.

The species diversity of Streptaxidae reaches its maximum in sub-Saharan Africa.

With 13 genera and about 130 nominal species, the second most diverse streptaxid fauna can be found in Southeast Asia. Streptaxidae are the most diverse among tropical Asian carnivorous snails. In Indochina, streptaxid diversity was thought to comprise only 10 genera and about 40 species in 1967. However, in 2006–2016, 21 new species (more than half the previous total) and one new genus had been described from Indochina. Thirty-seven species are recorded from Thailand, 10 from Myanmar, 45 from Vietnam, and 12 from Laos.

Description
Streptaxids can generally be recognized by their eccentric or cylindrical shells, while the animals have a bright yellow to red or orange body with external hook-like structures on the everted penis.

Early classifications of the family such as Wilhelm Kobelt (1905–6), used mainly shell shape and the arrangement of apertural dentition. However, many shell characters are highly conserved or occur recurrently, making some species and genera difficult to separate. The reproductive organs of streptaxids can also be taxonomically significant.

Taxonomy 
Prior to Schileyko's revision  in 2000 only two subfamilies, the Streptaxinae and the Enneinae had been recognized, which were primarily based on their shell morphology.

2005 taxonomy 
Only the one family, Streptaxidae, was recognized within the Streptaxoidea in the taxonomy of Bouchet & Rocroi (2005).

There are 6 subfamilies in the family Streptaxidae according to the taxonomy of the Gastropoda by Bouchet & Rocroi, 2005, that follows Schileyko (2000):
 Streptaxinae Gray, 1860 - synonym: Artemonidae Bourguignat, 1889
 Enneinae Bourguignat, 1883 - synonym: Streptostelidae Bourguignat, 1889
 Marconiinae Schileyko, 2000
 Odontartemoninae Schileyko, 2000
 Orthogibbinae Germain, 1921 - synonyms: Gibbinae Steenberg, 1936; Gonidominae Steenberg, 1936
 Ptychotrematinae Pilsbry, 1919

2010 taxonomy 
Sutcharit et al. (2010) have established a new family Diapheridae within Streptaxoidea and they have added two genera Diaphera and Sinoennea into Diapheridae.

In the recent decades, most of the taxonomic and systematic research on streptaxids has been performed on sub-Saharan African taxa. Only a few publications focus on South American or Asian groups.

Genera
Genera in the family Streptaxidae include:

Streptaxinae
 Afristreptaxis Thiele, 1932
 Carinartemis Siriboon & Panha, 2014
 Discartemon Pfeiffer, 1856
 Edentulina L. Pfeiffer, 1856
 Elma Adams, 1866
 Fischerpietteus Emberton, 2003
 Glyptoconus Möllendorff, 1894
 Haploptychius Kobelt, 1905
 Hypselartemon Wenz, 1947
 Indoartemon Forcart, 1946
 Makrokonche Emberton, 1994
 Martinella Jousseaume, 1887
 Micrartemon Möllendorff, 1890
 Nagyelma Páll-Gergely & Hunyadi, 2021
 Odontartemon L. Pfeiffer, 1856
 Oophana Ancey, 1884
 Perrottetia Kobelt, 1905
 Rectartemon Baker, 1925
 Sairostoma Haas, 1938
 Stemmatopsis J. Mabille, 1887 
 Streptartemon Kobelt, 1905
 Streptaxis Gray, 1837 - type genus of the family Streptaxidae
 Thachia F. Huber, 2018

Enneinae
 Austromarconia van Bruggen & de Winter, 2003
 Avakubia Pilsbry, 1919
 Conogulella Pilsbry, 1919
 Costigulella Pilsbry, 1919
 Dadagulella Rowson & Tattersfield, 2013
 Digulella F. Haas, 1934
 Gulella Pfeiffer, 1856[2]
 Juventigulella Tattersfield, 1998
 Microstrophia Möllendorff, 1887
 Mirellia Thiele, 1933
 Mirigulella Pilsbry & Cockerell, 1933
 Paucidentella Thiele, 1933
 Primigulella Pilsbry, 1919
 Pseudavakubia de Winter & Vastenhout, 2013
 Pseudelma Kobelt, 1904
 Ptychotrema L. Pfeiffer, 1853
 Pupigulella Pilsbry, 1919 
 Rhabdogulella F. Haas, 1934
 Silvigulella Pilsbry, 1919
 Sphincterocochlion Verdcourt, 1985
 Sphinctostrema Girard, 1894
 Streptostele Dohrn, 1866
 Tomostele Ancey, 1885

Marconiinae
 Gonaxis J. W. Taylor, 1877
 Marconia Bourguignat, 1889 - type genus of the subfamily
 Stenomarconia Germain, 1934

Odontartemoninae
 Artemonopsis Germain, 1908
 Lamelliger Ancey, 1884
 Pseudogonaxis Thiele, 1932
 Tayloria Bourguignat, 1889

Orthogibbinae
 Acanthennea Martens, 1898 - with the only species Acanthennea erinacea (Martens, 1898)
 Augustula Thiele, 1931 - with the only species Augustula braueri (Martens, 1898)
 Careoradula Gerlach & van Bruggen, 1999 - with the only species Careoradula perelegans (Martens, 1898)
 Edentulina Pfeiffer, 1856
 Gibbulinella Wenz, 1920
 † Gibbus Montfort, 1810 - this genus was endemic to Mauritius and it is now extinct
 Glabrennea
 Gonaxis Taylor, 1877
 † Gonidomus Swainson, 1840 - this genus was endemic to Mauritius and it is now extinct
 Gonospira Swainson, 1840
 Haploptychius Kobelt, 1905
 Imperturbatia Martens, 1898
 Oophana Ancey, 1884
 Orthogibbus Germain, 1919 - type genus of the subfamily
 Plicadomus Swainson, 1840
 Priodiscus Martens, 1898
 Pseudelma Kobelt, 1904
 Seychellaxis
 Silhouettia Gerlach & van Bruggen, 1999 - with the only  species Silhouettia silhouettae (Martens, 1898)
 Stereostele Pilsbry, 1919 - with the only species Stereostele nevilli (Adams, 1868)

Unsorted to subfamily:
 Aenigmigulella Pilsbry & Cockerell, 1933
 Campolaemus Pilsbry, 1892
 Conturbatia Gerlach, 2001 - with the only species Conturbatia crenata Gerlach, 2001
 Costigulella Pilsbry, 1919 - formerly included in Gulella
  † Goniodomulus Harzhauser & Neubauer in Harzhauser et al., 2016
 Pallgergelyia Thach, 2017
 Parvedentulina Emberton & Pearce, 2000 - endemic to Madagascar
 † Pfefferiola Harzhauser & Neubauer, 2021 
 † Protostreptaxis W. Yü & X.-Q. Zhang, 1982 
 Sinistrexcisa De Winter, Gomez & Prieto, 1999: synonym of Ptychotrema L. Pfeiffer, 1853

Notes
 Scolodonta Doering, 1875 used to be classified within Streptaxinae, but Scolodonta is the type genus of the family Scolodontidae.

Synonyms
 Subfamily Gibbinae Steenberg, 1936: synonym of Orthogibbinae Germain, 1921
 Subfamily Gonidominae Steenberg, 1936: synonym of Orthogibbinae Germain, 1921
 Subfamily Ptychotrematinae Pilsbry, 1919: synonym of Enneinae Bourguignat, 1883
 Aberdaria Blume, 1965: synonym of Primigulella Pilsbry, 1919 (junior synonym)
 Acanthenna: synonym of Acanthennea E. von Martens, 1898 (misspelling)
 Adjua Chaper, 1885: synonym of Ptychotrema (Adjua) Chaper, 1885 represented as Ptychotrema L. Pfeiffer, 1853 (original rank)
 Alcidia Bourguignat, 1890: synonym of Streptaxis Gray, 1837
 Artemon H. Beck, 1837: synonym of Streptaxis Gray, 1837
 Campylaxis Ancey, 1888: synonym of Streptostele Dohrn, 1866
 Carychiopsis E. von Martens, 1895: synonym of Ennea H. Adams & A. Adams, 1855: synonym of Ptychotrema (Ennea) H. Adams & A. Adams, 1855 represented as Ptychotrema L. Pfeiffer, 1853
 Colpanostoma Bourguignat, 1890: synonym of Tayloria (Tayloria) Bourguignat, 1890 represented as Tayloria Bourguignat, 1890 (junior synonym)
 Ennea H. Adams & A. Adams, 1855 - type genus of the subfamily : synonym of Ptychotrema (Ennea) H. Adams & A. Adams, 1855 represented as Ptychotrema L. Pfeiffer, 1853
 Enneastrum L. Pfeiffer, 1856: synonym of Ennea H. Adams & A. Adams, 1855: synonym of Ptychotrema (Ennea) H. Adams & A. Adams, 1855 represented as Ptychotrema L. Pfeiffer, 1853
 Eustreptaxis L. Pfeiffer, 1878: synonym of Streptaxis Gray, 1837 (objective junior synonym)
 Eustreptostele Germain, 1915: synonym of Streptostele (Tomostele) Ancey, 1885: synonym of Tomostele Ancey, 1885
 Gibbonsia Bourguignat, 1890: synonym of Gigantaxis Tomlin, 1930: synonym of Tayloria (Tayloria) Bourguignat, 1890 represented as Tayloria Bourguignat, 1890 (junior primary homonym of Gibbonsia Cooper, 1864)
 Gibbulina Beck, 1837: synonym of Gibbus Montfort, 1810 (invalid; unnecessary replacement name for Gibbus Monfort, 1810)
 Gigantaxis Tomlin, 1930: synonym of Tayloria (Tayloria) Bourguignat, 1890 represented as Tayloria Bourguignat, 1890
 Haplonepion Pilsbry, 1919: synonym of Ptychotrema (Haplonepion) Pilsbry, 1919 represented as Ptychotrema L. Pfeiffer, 1853
 Huttonella Pfeiffer, 1855: synonym of Gulella (Huttonella) L. Pfeiffer, 1856 represented as Gulella L. Pfeiffer, 1856
 Idolum L. Pfeiffer, 1856: synonym of Gonidomus Swainson, 1840 (junior synonym)
 Indoennea Kobelt, 1904: synonym of Sinoennea Kobelt, 1904 (junior synonym)
 Ischnostele C. R. Boettger, 1915: synonym of Streptostele (Raffraya) Bourguignat, 1883 represented as Streptostele Dohrn, 1866
 Luntia E.A. Smith, 1898: synonym of Streptostele (Tomostele) Ancey, 1885: synonym of Tomostele Ancey, 1885 (junior synonym)
 Macrogonaxis Bequaert & Clench, 1936: synonym of Tayloria (Macrogonaxis) Thiele, 1932 represented as Tayloria Bourguignat, 1890
 Marconia Bourguignat, 1890: synonym of Gonaxis J. W. Taylor, 1877 (junior synonym)
 Maurennea: synonym of Gulella (Maurennea) Schileyko, 2000 represented as Gulella L. Pfeiffer, 1856
 Nevillia E. von Martens, 1880: synonym of Microstrophia Möllendorff, 1887 (junior homonym of Nevillia H. Adams, 1868)
 † Oppenheimiella Pfeffer, 1930 : synonym of † Pfefferiola Harzhauser & Neubauer, 2021  (Invalid: junior homonym of Oppenheimiella Meunier, 1893 [Diptera]; Pfefferiola is a replacement name)
 Orthogibbus Germain, 1919: synonym of Gonospira Swainson, 1840
 Parennea Pilsbry, 1919: synonym of Ptychotrema (Parennea) Pilsbry, 1919 represented as Ptychotrema L. Pfeiffer, 1853
 Pseudartemon J. Mabille, 1887: synonym of Haploptychius Kobelt, 1905
 Raffraya Bourguignat, 1883: synonym of Streptostele (Raffraya) Bourguignat, 1883 represented as Streptostele Dohrn, 1866
 Sinistrexcisa de Winter, Gómez & Prieto, 1999: synonym of Ptychotrema L. Pfeiffer, 1853
 Somalitayloria Verdcourt, 1962: synonym of Tayloria (Somalitayloria) Verdcourt, 1962 represented as Tayloria Bourguignat, 1890
 Stenomarconia Germain, 1934: synonym of Gonaxis (Stenomarconia) Germain, 1934 represented as Gonaxis J. W. Taylor, 1877
 Thaumatogulella F. Haas, 1951: synonym of Mirellia Thiele, 1933
 Varicostele Pilsbry, 1919: synonym of Streptostele (Varicostele) Pilsbry, 1919 represented as Streptostele Dohrn, 1866
 Webbia Odhner, 1932: synonym of Gibbulinella Wenz, 1920

See also 
 taxa of Streptaxidae described by Adolph Cornelis van Bruggen

References 
This article includes CC-BY-3.0 text from the reference and CC-BY-4.0 from the reference

Further reading

External links 
 Rowson, B. (2010). Systematics and diversity of the Streptaxidae (Gastropoda: Stylommatophora). Ph.D. thesis, University of Wales, Cardiff. Pp. i–vii + 1–307

 
Taxa named by John Edward Gray